The 1967 Individual Ice Speedway World Championship was the second edition of the World Championship.

The winner was Boris Samorodov of the Soviet Union. Samodorov had previously won the 1965 European Ice Speedway Championship, the predecessor to this competition.

Final 

  Ufa, February 25–26
  Moscow, March 1
  Leningrad, March 3

References

Ice speedway competitions
Ice